Mané is a town in Burkina Faso. It is the capital of Mane Department in Sanmatenga Province. Mané one of the Mossi principalities and was founded in the 16th century.

References

Populated places in the Centre-Nord Region
Sanmatenga Province